Dagli Appennini alle Ande is a 1959 Italian - Argentine film directed by Folco Quilici.

Cast
 Marco Paoletti	as	Marco Valesini
 Eleonora Rossi Drago	as	Marco's mother
 Fausto Tozzi	as 	Marco's father

External links
 

1959 films
1950s Spanish-language films
Argentine black-and-white films
Films based on works by Edmondo De Amicis
Works based on Heart (novel)
1950s Argentine films